Do Kuhak or Dow Kuhak or Dokoohak or Dukuhak may refer to:
 Do Kuhak, Arsanjan, Fars Province
 Do Kuhak, Shiraz, Fars Province
 Do Kuhak, Kerman
 Do Kuhak, Khuzestan
 Do Kuhak, Kohgiluyeh and Boyer-Ahmad